Mangnai also known as Mang'ai or Mangya is a county-level city in the northwest of Qinghai Province, China, bordering Xinjiang to the north and west. It is under the administration of Haixi Mongol and Tibetan Autonomous Prefecture. In 2018 it had a population of 63,000. The name Mangnai is based on the Mongolian word for 'forehead'.

It was formed in 2018 when the Mangnai and Lenghu administrative zones merged to establish the county-level city of Mangnai.

Economy 
Mangnai had a large asbestos mine, it was the largest in China, it also holds around half of China's serpentine reserves. It also produces oil, natural gas, celestite, and sodium sulfate.

Administrative divisions 
Mangnai's administrative center is the town of Huatugou.

Towns

 Huatugou
 Lenghu

Demographics 
17 different ethnic groups live in the city, including the Han Chinese, Mongols, Tibetans, the Hui, Salars, Monguors, Manchus, Dongxiangs, and Uighurs.

Climate

Tourism 
The main touristic sites in Mangnai are:

 Emerald Lake
 Qianfo cliffs
 Gasi Lake
 Yingxiongling Danxia Landform
 Alar Wetland
 Yardang landform
In 2019, a camp meant to simulate conditions on the planet Mars opened in the town of Lenghu, which is primarily geared towards tourists.

Transport 
Mangnai is located strategically on one of the main transport corridors between Gansu and Xinjiang. The Huatugou Airport serves Mangnai and the city is served by the Golmud–Korla railway and is located along China National Highway 315.

Notelist

References

County-level divisions of Qinghai
Haixi Mongol and Tibetan Autonomous Prefecture
Cities in Qinghai